Dendropsophus cruzi is a species of frogs in the family Hylidae.

Habitat
Endemic to Brazil, its natural habitats are dry savanna, moist savanna, swamps, freshwater marshes, and intermittent freshwater marshes. It also inhabits pastureland, rural gardens, ponds, and canals and ditches.

Threats
The frog is threatened by habitat loss.

References

cruzi
Endemic fauna of Brazil
Amphibians described in 1998
Taxonomy articles created by Polbot